Doris kyolis is a species of sea slug, a dorid nudibranch, a shell-less marine gastropod mollusk in the family Dorididae.

Distribution
Distribution of Doris kyolis includes Rio de Janeiro State, southeastern Brazil.

Description
The maximum recorded body length is 18 mm.

Ecology
Minimum recorded depth is 1 m. Maximum recorded depth is 1 m.

Prey of Doris kyolis include sponges Dysidea etheria, Lissondendoryx isodictialis, Haliclona sp. and Plakina sp.

References

External links

Dorididae
Gastropods described in 1967
Taxa named by Eveline Du Bois-Reymond Marcus
Taxa named by Ernst Marcus (zoologist)